Olavi Svanberg (December 10, 1941, Sysmä, Finland – August 25, 2002, Lake Ladoga, Russia) was a Finnish ski-orienteering competitor and world champion. He received an individual gold medal at the first World Ski Orienteering Championships in Hyvinkää in 1975, and also won the first gold medal in the relay event with the Finnish team (Pekka Pökälä, Heimo Taskinen, Jorma Karvonen and Olavi Svanberg). He was again world champion in 1982 in Aigen.

See also
 Finnish orienteers
 List of orienteers
 List of orienteering events

References

1941 births
2002 deaths
Finnish orienteers
Male orienteers
Ski-orienteers
People from Sysmä
Sportspeople from Päijät-Häme